Wilhelm Ahlwardt (4 July 1828, Greifswald – 2 November 1909, Greifswald) was a German orientalist who specialized in research of Arabic literature. He was the son of philologist Christian Wilhelm Ahlwardt (1760–1830).

Biography 
He studied oriental philology at the University of Greifswald (1846–48, 1849–50) as a student of Johann Gottfried Ludwig Kosegarten and at the University of Göttingen (1848–49) under Heinrich Ewald. After graduation, he spent several years studying Arab manuscripts in libraries at Gotha and Paris. In 1856 he began work as an assistant librarian at Greifswald, obtaining his habilitation during the following year. In 1861 he became a professor at the university.

Published works 
His main work was the masterful Verzeichnis der arabischen Handschriften (1887–1899), a 10 volume catalogue of Arabic manuscripts kept at the Royal Library of Berlin. As a dedication to the 400 year jubilee of the university at Greifswald (1856), he published Über Poesie und Poetik der Araber ("On Poetry and Poetics of the Arabs"). Other principal works by Ahlwardt are:
 Chalef elahmar's Qasside: Berichtigter arabischer Text, 1859 – (Khalaf al-Aḥmar's qasida).
 "The divans of the six ancient Arabic poets Ennabiga, 'Antara, Tharafa, Zuhair, 'Alqama and Imruulqais", Trübner & co., London, 1870 (in English).
 Al-Fakhrî by Muḥammad ibn ʻAlī Ibn al-Ṭiqṭaqā (Paris, É. Bouillon, 1895).

References 

1828 births
1909 deaths
People from Greifswald
University of Greifswald alumni
Academic staff of the University of Greifswald
University of Göttingen alumni
German orientalists
German librarians
German male non-fiction writers